Lucas Zakaria (born 18 August 1971) is an Indonesian fencer. He competed in the individual épée event at the 1992 Summer Olympics.

References

External links
 

1971 births
Living people
Indonesian male épée fencers
Olympic fencers of Indonesia
Fencers at the 1992 Summer Olympics
20th-century Indonesian people